The Planetary Science Institute (PSI)  is a 501(c)(3) non-profit research institute based in Tucson, Arizona, focusing on planetary science. , its director is Dr. Mark V. Sykes. PSI, along with Space Science Institute (SSI) Southwest Research Institute (SwRI), and Eureka Scientific, were listed as 501(c)(3) organizations in the US in a special report by Nature in 2007, which facilitate federal grant applications of non-tenure-track astronomers.

Description 

Founded in 1972 by William Kenneth Hartmann, PSI is involved in many NASA missions, the study of Mars, asteroids, comets, interplanetary dust, the formation of the Solar System, extrasolar planets, the origin of life, and other scientific topics. It actively participated in the Dawn mission, which explored Vesta between 2011 and 2012, and Ceres between 2015 and 2018. It managed the GRaND  a Gamma Ray and Neutron Detector spectrometer, which mapped the surfaces of the two minor planets to determine how they were formed and evolved.

PSI's orbit@home was a distributed computing project through which the public can help in the search for near-Earth objects. The institute is also involved in science education through school programs, popular science books and art.

Notable people
 Aileen Yingst, geologist and senior scientist for the Planetary Science Institute
 Pamela L. Gay, Senior Education and Communication Specialist and Senior Scientist

See also 
 Space Science Institute
 Space Studies Institute
 Southwest Research Institute

References

External links
 

Research institutes in Arizona
Solar System
Planetary science
Space science organizations
1972 establishments in Arizona
Research institutes established in 1972
Organizations based in Tucson, Arizona